El Cubo de Cuba, or simply Cubo, is a Cuban restaurant in Portland, Oregon.

Description
Starting as a food cart and later becoming a brick and mortar operation in southeast Portland's Richmond neighborhood, the restaurant serves Cuban street food, including Cuban sandwiches, guava chicken, maduros, and mojo pork. The drink menu includes daiquiris, mojitos, and sangria.

History
The brick and mortar restaurant opened in 2013.

See also
 Hispanics and Latinos in Portland, Oregon

References

External links

 
 
 El Cubo de Cuba at Zomato

Cuban restaurants in the United States
Cuban-American culture in Portland, Oregon
Food carts in Portland, Oregon
Latin American restaurants in Portland, Oregon
Richmond, Portland, Oregon